Maurício Quintella Malta Lessa (born 28 March 1971 in Maceió) is a Brazilian lawyer and politician affiliated to the Party of the Republic (PR). Discharged from the Chamber of Deputies, Lessa assumed the office of minister of Transports, Ports and Civil Aviation, appointed by president Michel Temer. Left the Ministry to run for a new term as deputy, returning to the Chamber consequently.

References

1971 births
Living people
Liberal Party (Brazil, 2006) politicians
Brazilian Socialist Party politicians
Democratic Labour Party (Brazil) politicians
People from Maceió
Government ministers of Brazil
20th-century Brazilian lawyers